Hydrelaps is a monotypic genus of venomous sea snake in the family Elapidae. The genus contains the sole species Hydrelaps darwiniensis, also commonly known as the black-ringed mangrove snake, the black-ringed sea snake, Darwin's sea snake, and the Port Darwin sea snake. The species is native to Australia and New Guinea.

Etymology 
The specific name, darwiniensis, refers to the city of Darwin, Northern Territory, Australia.

Habitat 

Reproduction 
H. darwiniensis is viviparous.

References

Further reading
Boulenger GA (1896). Catalogue of the Snakes in the British Museum (Natural History). Volume III., Containing the Colubridæ (Opisthoglyphæ and Proteroglyphæ), Amblycephalidæ, and Viperidæ. London: Trustees of the British Museum (Natural History). (Taylor and Francis, printers). xiv + 727 pp. + Plates I–XXV. (Hydrelaps, new genus, p. 270; H. darwiniensis, new species, p. 270 + Plate XII, figure 1, five views).
Cogger HG (2014). Reptiles and Amphibians of Australia, Seventh Edition. Clayton, Victoria, Australia: CSIRO Publishing. xxx + 1,033 pp. .
Rasmussen AR, Sanders KL, Guinea ML, Amey AP (2014). "Sea snakes in Australian waters (Serpentes: subfamilies Hydrophiinae and Laticaudinae)—a review with an updated identification key". Zootaxa 3869 (4): 351–371.
Wilson S, Swan G (2013). A Complete Guide to Reptiles of Australia, Fourth Edition. Sydney: New Holland Publishers. 522 pp. .

Elapidae
Monotypic snake genera
Snakes of New Guinea
Snakes of Australia
Reptiles described in 1896
Sea snakes